Witherspoon may refer to:

People
Witherspoon (surname)

Additional uses
John Witherspoon College, a non-denominational Christian liberal arts college in Rapid City, South Dakota 
Witherspoon Cottage, a historic cure cottage located at Saranac Lake, New York
Witherspoon Building, a historic office building located in Philadelphia, Pennsylvania.
Witherspoon-Hunter House, a historic home located at York, York County, South Carolina
Witherspoon Institute, a think tank in Princeton, New Jersey
John Witherspoon Middle School in Princeton, New Jersey
The Witherspoon Lodge of Free and Accepted Masons, No. 111, historic building in Mount Dora, Florida
Witherspoon v. Illinois, 391 U.S. 510 (1968), U.S. Supreme Court case regarding selection of jurors  in capital cases
Witherspoon questions, questions asked of prospective jurors in capital cases in the United States about their views regarding capital punishment
Witherspoon Street School for Colored Children, a former school in Princeton, New Jersey
"The Curious Case of Edgar Witherspoon", the first episode of the third season (1988–89) of the television series The Twilight Zone
Miss Witherspoon, a play written in 2005 by Christopher Durang

See also
 Weatherspoon
 Wetherspoons, a pub company in the United Kingdom and the Republic of Ireland
 Wotherspoon